Nature Climate Change is a monthly peer-reviewed scientific journal published by Nature Publishing Group covering all aspects of research on global warming, the current climate change, especially its effects. It was established in 2011 as the continuation of Nature Reports Climate Change, itself established in 2007. Its first editor-in-chief was Olive Heffernan and the journal's current editor-in-chief is Bronwyn Wake. According to the Journal Citation Reports, the journal had a 2020 impact factor of 21.722.

References

External links 
 

Nature Research academic journals
Publications established in 2011
Climatology journals
Monthly journals
English-language journals